Vladimir Sergeyevich Lavrov (4 October 1919 – 7 June 2011) was a Soviet diplomat and ambassador.

Lavrov graduated from the Moscow Power Engineering Institute and Diplomatic Academy of the Ministry of Foreign Affairs of the Russian Federation and defended a habilitation in historical sciences. He took the following diplomatic positions:

 1947–1952 – official of the Ministry of Foreign Affairs
 1952–1953 – First Secretary of the Soviet Embassy to the United Kingdom 
 1953–1956 – assistant to the Deputy Foreign Minister of the Soviet Union
 1956–1959 – adviser at the Soviet Embassy to the United States
 1959–1960 – curator of Soviet-Yemen relations
 1960–1964 – senior official at the European division of the Ministry of Foreign Affairs 
 1964–1967 – Ambassador of the Soviet Union to Kenya
 1967–1973 – Ambassador of the Soviet Union to the Netherlands
 1973–1977 – director of the Personnel Division at the Ministry of Foreign Affairs 
 1977–1983 – Ambassador of the Soviet Union to Switzerland
 1983–1987 – Ambassador of the Soviet Union to Turkey

References

1919 births
2011 deaths
Ambassadors of the Soviet Union to the Netherlands
Ambassadors of the Soviet Union to Turkey
Ambassadors of the Soviet Union to Kenya
Ambassadors of the Soviet Union to Switzerland